Forbidden Dreams is a 1986 Czech drama film directed by Karel Kachyňa. It was entered into the 15th Moscow International Film Festival. The film was selected as the Czechoslovak entry for the Best Foreign Language Film at the 60th Academy Awards, but was not accepted as a nominee.

Cast
 Karel Heřmánek as Father
 Rudolf Hrušínský as Prosek
 Jiří Krampol as Hejtmánek
 Lubor Tokoš as Nejezchleb
 Marta Vančurová as Mother
 Dana Vlková as Irma
 Marek Valter as Prdelka (as Marek Walter)
 Ladislav Potměšil as Korálek
 Oldřich Vlach as Studený
 Milan Riehs as Jakubícek

See also
 List of submissions to the 60th Academy Awards for Best Foreign Language Film
 List of Czechoslovak submissions for the Academy Award for Best Foreign Language Film

References

External links
 

1986 films
1986 drama films
1980s Czech-language films
Czech war drama films
1987 drama films
1987 films
1980s war drama films
Czech World War II films
Czechoslovak World War II films
1980s Czech films